Jacob Kuresa (born October 2, 1983) is a former American football offensive lineman. Out of college Jake was signed as an undrafted free agent by the New Orleans Saints on May 2, 2007 but was waived on August 22, 2007. Kuresa was a 4-year starter at guard and tackle after redshirting his freshman year. He attended Mountain Crest High School in Hyrum, Utah. His senior year (2006) at Brigham Young University, Kuresa was an Honorable Mention All-American selection and First-team All MWC Tackle.

Family
Father Dave Kuresa was an offensive lineman at Utah State (1981–1984) and was a three time first-team All Pacific Coast Athletic Association (PCAA) from 1982-1984.

References

External links

Just Sports Stats

1983 births
Living people
People from Millville, Utah
American football offensive guards
American football offensive tackles
BYU Cougars football players
New Orleans Saints players
American sportspeople of Samoan descent
Players of American football from Utah